Ville de Marseille was a  74-gun ship of the line of the French Navy.

Career 
In January 1813, Louis-André Senez was given command of Ville de Marseille. At the Bourbon Restoration, she was tasked with ferrying Duke Louis Philippe d'Orléans from Palermo to France.

In 1827, she was upgraded to 80 guns. The next year, she took part in operations in Eastern Mediterranean under captain Cuvillier.

She took part in the Invasion of Algiers in 1830 as a troop ship. The next year, she took part in the Battle of the Tagus under Captain Baron Lasusse. In 1835 and 1836, she ferried troops to Algeria, before being refitted in 1841.

Ville de Marseille took part in the Crimean war as a troopship, and in the Bombardment of Sevastopol. As one of the oldest ships in the navy, she was sent back to France in late 1854.

She was used as a barracks hulk from 1858, and eventually broken up in Toulon in 1877.

Notes

Bibliography

External links

 ships-of-the-line

Ships of the line of the French Navy
Téméraire-class ships of the line
1812 ships